Alalcomenae or Alalkomenai, or Alcomenae or Alkomenai (Ἀλκομεναί), was a town in Ithaca, or in the small island Asteris in the neighbourhood of Ithaca.

Its site is located at the palaiokastro on modern Aëtos.

See also
 List of ancient Greek cities

References

Populated places in ancient Ithaca
Former populated places in Greece